Serbia is a nation that has competed at three Hopman Cup tournaments since it gained its independence following the breakup of Yugoslavia in the early 1990s. It first competed in the 18th Hopman Cup in 2006 (under the name Serbia and Montenegro). Serbia has reached the final on three occasions; the first time in 2008 where they lost to the United States, in 2011 where they had to retire before the final was played due to an abdominal injury sustained by Ana Ivanovic, and in 2013 when they lost to Spain.

Players
This is a list of players who have played for Serbia in the Hopman Cup.

Results

1 In the final, Janković was unable to play her singles match against Serena Williams of the USA due to injury. This gave the point to the US, giving them a one-point advantage going into the men's singles and mixed doubles matches.
2 Serbia finished top of their group in 2011 but due to an abdominal injury sustained by Ivanovic they were unable to participate in the final. They were instead replaced in the final by Belgium.

References

See also
Yugoslavia at the Hopman Cup

Hopman Cup teams
Hopman Cup
Hopman Cup